Pat Caputo (born ) is an American sports writer and radio talk show host based in Southeast Michigan. He is an on-air host and sports columnist for WXYT-FM in Detroit. He also occasionally appears on the WJBK local sports discussion show SportsWorks.

Early life
Caputo was raised in St. Clair Shores, Michigan, then moved to Birmingham, Michigan at the age of 9. He attended Groves High School and graduated from Michigan State University.

Career
He was hired by The Oakland Press in May 1983, covering the Detroit Tigers from 1986 to 1998 and the Detroit Lions from 1998 to 2002, before working as the paper's sports columnist in 2002. His career at The Oakland Press would last until 2020 where Caputo was laid off, though he remains employed as a sports columnist for WXYT-FM.

TV
In 1986, Caputo became a regular contributor to the Tigers round table segment on WDIV. He hosted a segment on the Tigers pregame show from 1990 to 1992 on PASS Sports, known as Caputo's Corner.

Radio
He began his radio career as a host at WDFN from 1996 to 2001, then would host The Book on Sports at WXYT in 2001 when the station switched to an all-sports format. The station would later move to WXYT-FM in 2007, changing the show's name to Pat Caputo, and he once co-hosted with Dennis Fithian for Caputo and Fithian until Fithian was laid off in 2020. At WXYT-FM, he currently hosts Pat Caputo on weekends and weeknights, as well as Inside Hockeytown, Pistons Tonight, and Tiger Talk.

Podcast
He also hosts a Detroit Tigers hot stove podcast with Dan Dickerson called TigerTalk during the winter months available on the Tigers' website and iTunes. In 2022, he started a podcast called Bustin' Balls with Pat Caputo which goes over draft prospects for all four major sports leagues with regards to the local sports teams in Detroit.

Honors
Caputo has been named the top sports columnist in Michigan by the Michigan Associated Press and the Michigan Press Association, and the top columnist in area by the Detroit Chapter of the Society of Professional Journalists. He has been named among the Top Ten sports columnists in the nation by the Associated Press Sports Editors.

Personal life
Caputo is a resident of Lake Orion, Michigan.

References

External links
 Column at 97.1 The Ticket
 

Living people
American radio personalities
Michigan State University alumni
American columnists
American sportswriters
Detroit Tigers announcers
Major League Baseball broadcasters
People from Birmingham, Michigan
People from Lake Orion, Michigan
Year of birth missing (living people)